Raznye Lyudi ( – Different people) is a band from Saint Petersburg, Russia (originally from Kharkiv, USSR, now Ukraine). First name of band was GPD - Gruppa Prodlennogo Dnya, was created in 1987.

Members
Aleksandr Chernetskiy (vocal, guitar)
Nail Kadirov (bass)
 (guitar)
Boris Shavennikov (drums)
Sergey Chigrakov (vocal, guitar)

External links
Official site (in Russian)

Musical groups established in 1987
Musical groups from Saint Petersburg
Russian rock music groups
Soviet rock music groups